is a district of Chiyoda, Tokyo, Japan. It is located north of Tokyo Station and Marunouchi, east of the Imperial Palace, west of Nihonbashi and south of Kanda.  It is the location of the former site of the village of Shibazaki, the most ancient part of Tokyo.

Ōtemachi is known as a center of Japanese journalism, housing the main offices of three of the "big five" newspapers as well as being a key financial center and headquarters for large Japanese corporations. It is also the location of the Japan Postal Museum (TeiPark).

The Tokyo Fire Department is headquartered in Ōtemachi.

History 

Ōtemachi derives its name of Ōtemon ("Great Hand Gate") of Edo Castle. During the Edo period, various daimyōs constructed their lavish residences outside the castle, such as the residence of the daimyō Matsudaira Tadamasa. Ōtemachi was completely destroyed during the Great Fire of Meireki in 1657. It was rebuilt, albeit on a smaller, less grand scale. Ōtemachi remained however in the possession of the various daimyō families until the end of the Tokugawa system and the start of the Meiji period in the 1860s. The various daimyō families lost their lots as the area was repossessed by the government, who constructed various governmental offices. Today nothing remains of its residential past, the area is dotted with modern high-rise buildings.

In order to gain revenue, the government decided to sell the area into private hands. The area was completely redeveloped.

Companies based in Ōtemachi 

Asahi Mutual Life Insurance Co.
Daiwa Securities Group
Development Bank of Japan
Japan Post
Kyowa Hakko Kirin
Marubeni
Millea Holdings
Mitsubishi Estate Co.
Mitsui & Co.
Mitsui Life Insurance Co.
Mizuho Financial Group
Japan Finance Corporation
Nihon Keizai Shimbun
Nippon Soda
Nippon Telegraph and Telephone
Sankei Shimbun
Shin-Etsu Chemical
Yomiuri Shimbun

The Japanese offices of Sullivan & Cromwell, Citibank, Cushman & Wakefield, and Protiviti are also located in Ōtemachi.

Railway and subway stations 

Ōtemachi Station (Chiyoda Line, Hanzōmon Line, Marunouchi Line, Toei Mita Line, Tozai Line)
Tokyo Station, actually in the neighboring Marunouchi district (Chūō Line, Keihin-Tōhoku Line, Keiyō Line, Marunouchi Line, Shinkansen, Sōbu Line, Yamanote Line, Yokosuka Line)

It is possible to transfer between the two stations via underground passages.

Education
 operates public elementary and junior high schools. Chiyoda Elementary School (千代田小学校) is the zoned elementary of Ōtemachi 2-chōme and portions of Ōtemachi 1-chōme (1 to 3 and 5 to 9-ban). Ōtemachi 1-chōme 4-ban is zoned to Ochanomizu Elementary School (お茶の水小学校). There is a freedom of choice system for junior high schools in Chiyoda Ward, and so there are no specific junior high school zones.

See also 

 Ōtemachi Station (Tokyo)
 Taira no Masakado

References

External links

Districts of Chiyoda, Tokyo